Puthunagaram is a town and gram panchayat in the Palakkad district, state of Kerala, India.

It is about 10 km south of Palakkad and 8 Km from Kollengode. Palakkad-Pollachi-Dindukal-Madurai-Rameswaram train line passes through this town.

Demographics
 India census, Puthunagaram had a population of 16,367. Males constitute 50% of the population and females 50%. Puthunagaram has an average literacy rate of 73%, higher than the national average of 59.5%: male literacy is 80%, and female literacy is 67%. In Puthunagaram, 12% of the population is under 6 years of age.

References

Villages in Palakkad district
Gram panchayats in Palakkad district